The Nepal International is an international badminton tournament held in Kathmandu, Nepal. The tournament sanctioned by the Badminton World Federation and part of the Badminton Asia circuit.

Past winners

Performances by nation

References 

Badminton tournaments in Nepal
2005 establishments in Nepal